Greek pronunciation may refer to:

Ancient Greek phonology
Koine Greek phonology
Modern Greek phonology